Princetown railway station, opened in 1883 was the terminus of the 10.5 mile long single track branch line in Devon, England, running from Yelverton with eventually four intermediate stops, three being halts and one at Dousland as a fully fledged station.

History
The branch line was authorised in 1878 and opened on 11 August 1883. The station had a single platform, a passing loop, goods yard, signal box, goods shed, an engine shed for two locomotives, a 180 foot long carriage shed and a turntable.

Much of the route followed the course of the old Plymouth and Dartmoor Railway. The freight traffic on the branch line included granite from the rail served quarries of Swelltor and Foggintor which were closed in 1906.

The line was owned by the Princetown Railway until 1 January 1922, the company then merged with the Great Western Railway (GWR).

The station was host to a GWR camp coach in 1934 and 1938.

The line passed to British Railways (Western Region) in 1948 and closed on 3 March 1956. The station buildings were all demolished soon after closure.

Much of the old track formation now forms the route of the Dousland to Princetown Railway Track.

References
Notes

Sources

External links
 The Encyclopaedia of Plymouth History – GWR Branch 1922–47
 The Encyclopaedia of Plymouth History – The Route in 1947
 The Encyclopaedia of Plymouth History – BR Branch 1948–56
 Photographs of the line at the present day at 

Disused railway stations in Devon
Railway stations in Great Britain opened in 1883
Railway stations in Great Britain closed in 1956
Former Great Western Railway stations